Brahmdev Sharma, popularly known as bhaiji, is an Indian educationist and the of Vidya Bhararti Akhil Bhartiya Shiksha Sansthan, the largest non governmental organization in the field of social work & education in India. a non profit making organization working in the educational sector.

References

Recipients of the Padma Shri in literature & education
20th-century Indian educational theorists
Living people
People from Delhi
Year of birth missing (living people)